Yellow crownbeard is a common name for several plants and may refer to:

Verbesina helianthoides, native to the United States
Verbesina occidentalis

See also
Golden crownbeard